The Woodmen of the World Building in Nacogdoches, Texas was built in 1923.  It is a two-part commercial block building.  Its third floor served historically as a meeting hall of the local Woodmen of the World chapter, which was organized in 1908, until 1975 when the chapter moved elsewhere.  Its first and second floors were leased to businesses.  It was listed on the National Register of Historic Places in 1992.

It is a three-story building constructed with load-bearing masonry walls.  It was built at cost of $15,656.00 to contractor Moore Construction Co. for the structure and $10,000 to R. W. Parrish for woodwork.  Its NRHP nomination asserts that it is an "outstanding" example of early 20th-century architecture in Nagodoches and that it "is most noted for its strong vertical expression. This is established by the use of 3-story piers on each comer and in the center bay that rise to a stepped parapet, and the vertical muntins found on all windows."

See also

National Register of Historic Places listings in Nacogdoches County, Texas

References

External links

Buildings and structures completed in 1923
Buildings and structures in Nacogdoches County, Texas
Woodmen of the World buildings
Clubhouses in Texas
Clubhouses on the National Register of Historic Places in Texas
National Register of Historic Places in Nacogdoches County, Texas